Siebren "Rick" Mulder (born 7 December 1996) is a Dutch footballer who plays for TEC in the Tweede Divisie.

Club career
He made his professional debut in the Eerste Divisie for RKC Waalwijk on 29 April 2016 in a game against MVV Maastricht.

References

External links
 

1996 births
People from Oosterhout
Living people
Dutch footballers
Dutch expatriate footballers
RKC Waalwijk players
Jong FC Utrecht players
Royal Cappellen F.C. players
Eerste Divisie players
Association football midfielders
Dutch expatriate sportspeople in Belgium
Expatriate footballers in Belgium
Tweede Divisie players
SV TEC players
Footballers from North Brabant